5-Methoxy-3,4-methylenedioxymethamphetamine (MMDMA; 5-MeO-MDMA) is a designer drug of the substituted methylenedioxyphenethylamine (MDxx) class. Little is known about its effects and it has not been formally studied in animals.

References 

Benzodioxoles
Phenol ethers
Methamphetamines